Jane Ruth Aceng (born 11 May 1968) is a Ugandan pediatrician and politician. She is the Minister of Health in the Cabinet of Uganda. She was appointed to that position on 6 June 2016. Before that, from June 2011 until June 2016, she served as the Director General of Medical Services in the Ugandan Ministry of Health.

Background and education
Aceng was born on 11 May 1968. She attended Shimoni Primary School in Kampala, Uganda's capital city. She studied at Nabisunsa Girls Secondary School for both her Ordinary and Advanced Level education. She holds a Bachelor of Medicine and Bachelor of Surgery, a Master of Medicine in Pediatrics, and a Master of Public Health, all from the Makerere University College of Health Sciences. She also holds a Diploma in Health Systems Management awarded by the Galilee International Management Institute, in Israel.

Career
Aceng began serving as a medical officer in the health ministry. At the time she was appointed Director General of Medical Services, she was serving as executive director of Lira Regional Referral Hospital.

Other considerations
Aceng is a member of the board of directors of the Infectious Diseases Institute. She also served as a member of the board of Uganda National Medical Stores, the pharmaceutical procurement and distribution arm of the health ministry, from 2005 until 2016.

Political career
In July 2020, Dr Jane Ruth Aceng declared her intentions to contest for the position of Women Representative for Lira District, in the 11th Parliament (2021 - 2026). She intends to run on the ruling National Resistance Movement political party ticket.

Controversy
As early as 2014, three variables in the national health system began to converge to the level of a crisis. 
 Uganda has at least 8 public and private medical schools, graduating close to 500 medical doctors annually. Before they receive their medical licenses, each doctor has to undergo 12 months of rigorous supervision under a consultant physician or surgeon. 
 Due to poor pay, dilapidated equipment, lack of resources including medication and a poor work environment, many Ugandan medical and surgical consultants have left to work in better environments in other countries. 
 The small national healthcare budget leaves the health ministry with insufficient funds to pay the few consultants left, the senior house officers (SHOs) training to become consultants, and the ever-increasing number of interns working so they can get licensed.
As a consequence, the ministry of health has been pitted against the SHOs who are not compensated at all and the interns who are poorly and irregularly paid. In an attempt to conserve funds, Aceng as minister has accused some universities of graduating too many substandard doctors, although both the Uganda Medical and Dental Practitioners Council (UMDPC) and the East African Community Medical and Dental Practitioners Boards and Councils disagree with her. These are the statutory government agencies in the East African Community which are mandated to maintain the standard of medical and dental training and physician and dentist competency.

As of 2016, perhaps the most controversial of Aceng´s proposals is the new requirement that interns take a new national examination, before the health ministry can assign them an internship slot. This has not gone well with the 2016/2017 intern class, prompting a lawsuit that is  winding through the legal system.

Research works
Aceng has participated and published widely in the field of medicine and some of her works are outlined below;
 2021: The Ugandan Severe Acute Respiratory Syndrome -Coronavirus 2 (SARS-CoV-2) Model: A Data Driven Approach to Estimate Risk
 2020: Estimating the Effect and Cost-Effectiveness of Facemasks in Reducing the Spread of the Severe Acute Respiratory Syndrome-Coronavirus 2 (SARS-CoV-2) in Uganda
 2020: Family Health Days program contributions in vaccination of unreached and under-immunized children during routine vaccinations in Uganda
 2019: Uganda's experience in Ebola virus disease outbreak preparedness, 2018–2019.
 2018: Prevalence of protective tetanus antibodies and immunological response following tetanus toxoid vaccination among men seeking medical circumcision services in Uganda
 2016: Tetanus Cases After Voluntary Medical Male Circumcision for HIV Prevention - Eastern and Southern Africa, 2012-2015
 2015: Multidistrict outbreak of Marburg virus disease—Uganda, 2012.
 2015: Is the glass half full or half empty? A qualitative exploration on treatment practices and perceived barriers to biomedical care for patients with nodding syndrome in post-conflict northern Uganda
 2014: Ebola Viral Hemorrhagic Disease Outbreak in West Africa- Lessons from Uganda.
 2013: Nodding syndrome in Ugandan children—clinical features, brain imaging and complications: a case series
 2005: Rectal artemether versus intravenous quinine for the treatment of cerebral malaria in children in Uganda: randomised clinical trial

See also
 Parliament of Uganda
 Ministry of Health (Uganda)

References

External links
The 'fast, efficient and incorruptible' ministers forming Museveni's Cabinet

Living people
1968 births
Langi people
Ugandan pediatricians
Members of the Parliament of Uganda
Government ministers of Uganda
21st-century Ugandan women politicians
21st-century Ugandan politicians
People from Northern Region, Uganda
Makerere University alumni
Women government ministers of Uganda
People from Lira District
Women members of the Parliament of Uganda
People educated at Nabisunsa Girls' Secondary School
National Resistance Movement politicians
21st-century Ugandan women scientists
21st-century Ugandan scientists
Women pediatricians